Tread Softly is a 1952 British crime film with musical overtones, directed by David MacDonald and starring Frances Day, Patricia Dainton and John Bentley. A chorus girl investigates a series of mysterious happenings at a derelict theatre.

It was made at Marylebone Studios and at the Granville Theatre in Fulham. While made as a second feature it also had aspirations to top the bill in some cinemas.

Set in a theatre it allows an odd combination of light musical numbers with a murder crime story. It includes several elaborate  dance routines.

Cast
 Frances Day as Madeleine Peters  
 Patricia Dainton as Tangye Ward  
 John Bentley as Keith Gilbert  
 John Laurie as Angus McDonald  
 Olaf Olsen as Philip Defoe  
 Nora Nicholson as Isobel Mayne  
 Harry Locke as Nutty Potts  
 Betty Baskcomb as Olivia Winter  
 Robert Urquhart as Clifford Brett  
 Ronald Leigh-Hunt as Inspector Hinton  
 Michael Ward as Alexander Mayne  
 Nelly Arno 
 Hamilton Keene 
 Betty Hare 
 Colin Croft as Dancer
 Kenneth MacMillan as Dancer  
 Keith Sawbridge  as Pianist  
 Anthony Verner

References

Bibliography
 Chibnall, Steve & McFarlane, Brian. The British 'B' Film. Palgrave MacMillan, 2009.

External links
 

1952 films
1952 crime films
British black-and-white films
British crime films
Films directed by David MacDonald (director)
Films set in London
1950s English-language films
1950s British films